Arthur Stein may refer to:
 Arthur Stein (political scientist)
 Arthur Stein (historian)
 Arthur Stein (activist)